Nnenna Lynch (born July 3, 1971, in New York City, New York) is a retired middle distance and long distance runner from the United States.

She won the gold medal at the 1997 Summer Universiade in Catania, Italy in the women's 5,000 metres event, when she defeated Canada's Lori Durward (second) and Sarah Howell (third).

In January 1998, she placed first at the US world cross-country trials in Orlando, qualifying her to represent the country at the 1998 IAAF World Cross Country Championships at Marrakech, where the US women's team finished 5th.

Currently lives in New York with her husband Jonathon Kahn and two young children. She is the sister of runner and filmmaker Shola Lynch.

References
 Profile at trackfield.brinkster
 Profile at USATF

1971 births
Living people
American female middle-distance runners
American female long-distance runners
Universiade medalists in athletics (track and field)
Sportspeople from New York (state)
Universiade gold medalists for the United States
Medalists at the 1997 Summer Universiade
20th-century American women
Villanova Wildcats women's track and field athletes
Villanova Wildcats women's cross country runners